On the 28th July 2017, a passenger train crashed into a buffer stop and derailed at  station in Barcelona, Spain. Sixty people were injured, eleven of them seriously, including the driver.

Accident
The accident happened at about 07:15 CEST (05:15 UTC). A commuter train collided with the buffers at  station and derailed. The train was operating a  –  service on the R2 line.

The train involved was an electric multiple unit of RENFE Class 465, number 210M. Witnesses stated that the train did not brake on entering the station. Fifty-six people were injured, five seriously. Eighteen people were taken to hospital. Victims were taken to four different hospitals in Barcelona.

Investigation
The Administrador de Infraestructuras Ferroviarias (ADIF) opened an investigation into the accident. The Comisión de Investigación de Accidentes Ferroviarios (CIAF) is also responsible for investigating railway accidents in Spain. Its staff were seen on site following the accident. The train driver was found not to have been under the influence of drugs or alcohol. The train event recorder was recovered from the train.

References 

2017 in Catalonia
Train crash 2017
July 2017 events in Spain
Railway accidents in 2017
Derailments in Spain
Train crash 2017